Anton Janeshitsh  was a politician of the early 18th century in Slovenia, when the country was under the Holy Roman Empire. He became mayor of Ljubljana in 1712. He was succeeded by Jakob Herendler in 1716.

References

Mayors of places in the Holy Roman Empire
Mayors of Ljubljana
Year of birth missing
Year of death missing
18th-century Carniolan people